The Crimean Autonomous Soviet Socialist Republic was a polity on the Crimean Peninsula within the Ukrainian Soviet Socialist Republic that was formed during the collapse of the Soviet Union and a year later was renamed the Republic of Crimea.

History

On 12 February 1991, the status of the Crimean Oblast was changed to that of autonomous republic by the Supreme Soviet of the Ukrainian SSR as the result of a state-sanctioned referendum held on 20 January 1991. 4 months later, on June 19, appropriate changes were made to the Constitution of the Ukrainian SSR.

Following approval of Ukrainian independence national referendum the region became part of the newly independent state of Ukraine. With effect from 6 May 1992, the Autonomous Soviet Socialist Republic was transformed into the Republic of Crimea within Ukraine. In September 1991 the Crimean parliament declared the territory to be a sovereign constituent part of Ukraine.

The status of Sevastopol, due to its strategic importance as the main base of the Russian Black Sea Fleet, remained disputed between Ukraine and Russia until 1997 when it was agreed that it should be treated as a "city with special status" within Ukraine. 

Since 2014, the Crimean Peninsula has been under Russian control following the annexation of Crimea by the Russian Federation.

Leadership
Chairman of the Supreme Council
 22 March 1991 – 9 May 1994 Mykola Bahrov
Chairman of the Council of Ministers
 22 March 1991 – 20 May 1993 Vitaliy Kurashik

See also
Crimea in the Soviet Union

References

Political history of Crimea
1991 establishments in Ukraine
1992 disestablishments in Ukraine
States and territories established in 1991
States and territories disestablished in 1991